National Route 67 is a national highway in South Korea connects Chilgok County to Gunwi County. It established on 1 July 1996.

Main stopovers
 North Gyeongsang Province
 Chilgok County - Gumi - Gunwi County

Major intersections

 (■): Motorway
IS: Intersection, IC: Interchange

North Gyeongsang Province

References

67
Roads in North Gyeongsang